The Roman Catholic Archdiocese of Papeete (Latin: Archidioecesis Papeetensis; French: Archidiocèse de Papeete) is a Metropolitan Archdiocese in French Polynesia.  It is responsible for the suffragan diocese of Taiohae o Tefenuaenata.

The diocese was elevated to the Archdiocese of Papeete in 1966.

Bishops

Ordinaries
 Florentin-Étienne Jaussen (1848–1884) 
 Marie-Joseph Verdier, SS.CC. (1884–1908) 
 André-Etienne-Athanase Hermel, SS.CC. (1908–1932) 
 Julien-Marie Nouailles, SS.CC. (1932–1937) 
 Paul-Laurent-Jean-Louis Mazé, SS.CC. (1938–1973) 
 Michel-Gaspard Coppenrath (March 5, 1973 – June 4, 1999)
 Hubert Coppenrath (June 4, 1999 – March 31, 2011)
 Jean-Pierre Edmond Cottanceau, SS.CC. (since 15 December 2016)

Coadjutor bishops
Antoine-Magloire Doumer, SS.CC. (1848-1878), as Coadjutor vicar apostolic; did not succeed to see
Marie-Joseph (Maxime Justin Félix) Verdier, SS.CC. (1883-1884), as Coadjutor vicar apostolic
André-Etienne-Athanase Hermel, SS.CC. (1905-1908), as Coadjutor vicar apostolic
Michel-Gaspard Coppenrath (1968-1973)
Hubert Coppenrath (1997-1999)

References

External links
 

P
Papeete
Catholic Church in French Polynesia